The National Professional Teachers' Organisation of South Africa (NAPTOSA) is a professional organisation of teachers in South Africa.  It is headquartered in Pretoria, South Africa.

History
The union was founded in 1991 as a federation.  By 1997, it included the following unions:

 African Teachers' Association of South Africa
 National Union of Educators
 Professional Educators' Union
 Transvaal Association of Teachers
 Transvaal Teachers' Association

On 1 November 2006, NAPTOSA was reconstituted as a single, unitary, trade union.  The Professional Educators' Union opted to remain independent, but NAPTOSA works with it, the Natal Association of Teachers' Unions and the Suid-Afrikaanse Onderwysers Unie in the Combined Trade Unions, for the purpose of recognition by the Education Labour Relations Chamber.

References

External links
 NAPTOSA

Education trade unions
Trade unions in South Africa
2006 establishments in South Africa
Trade unions established in 2006